Cerium(IV) oxide, also known as ceric oxide, ceric dioxide, ceria, cerium oxide or cerium dioxide,  is an oxide of the rare-earth metal cerium. It is a pale yellow-white powder with the chemical formula CeO2.  It is an important commercial product and an intermediate in the purification of the element from the ores.  The distinctive property of this material is its reversible conversion to a non-stoichiometric oxide.

Production
Cerium occurs naturally as oxides, always as a mixture with other rare-earth elements. Its principal ores bastnaesite and monazite.  After extraction of the metal ions into aqueous base, Ce is separated from that mixture by addition of an oxidant followed by adjustment of the pH.  This step exploits the low solubility of CeO2 and the fact that other rare-earth elements resist oxidation.

Cerium(IV) oxide is formed by the calcination of cerium oxalate or cerium hydroxide.

Cerium also forms cerium(III) oxide, which is unstable and will oxidize to cerium(IV) oxide.

Structure and defect behavior
Cerium oxide adopts the fluorite structure, space group Fm3m, #225 containing 8-coordinate Ce4+ and 4-coordinate O2−. At high temperatures it releases oxygen to give a non-stoichiometric, anion deficient form that retains the fluorite lattice.  This material has the formula CeO(2−x), where 0 < x < 0.28. The value of x depends on both the temperature, surface termination and the oxygen partial pressure. The equation

has been shown to predict the equilibrium non-stoichiometry x over a wide range of oxygen partial pressures (103–10−4 Pa) and temperatures (1000–1900 °C).

The non-stoichiometric form has a blue to black color, and exhibits both ionic and electronic conduction with ionic being the most significant at temperatures > 500 °C.

Defect chemistry
In the most stable fluorite phase of ceria, it exhibits several defects depending on partial pressure of oxygen or stress state of the material.

The primary defects of concern are oxygen vacancies and small polarons (electrons localized on cerium cations). Increasing the concentration of oxygen defects increases the diffusion rate of oxide anions in the lattice as reflected in an increase in ionic conductivity.  These factors give ceria favorable performance in applications as a solid electrolyte in solid-oxide fuel cells. Undoped and doped ceria also exhibit high electronic conductivity at low partial pressures of oxygen due to reduction of the cerium ion leading to the formation of small polarons.  Since the oxygen atoms in a ceria crystal occur in planes, diffusion of these anions is facile. The diffusion rate increases as the defect concentration increases.

The presence of oxygen vacancies at terminating ceria planes governs the energetics of ceria interactions with adsorbate molecules, and its wettability. Controlling such surface interactions is key to harnessing ceria in catalytic applications.

Natural occurrence
Cerium(IV) oxide occurs naturally as the mineral cerianite-(Ce). It is a rare example of tetravalent cerium mineral, the other examples being stetindite-(Ce) and dyrnaesite-(La). The "-(Ce)" suffix is known as Levinson modifier and is used to show which element dominates in a particular site in the structure. It is often found in names of minerals bearing rare earth elements (REEs). Occurrence of cerianite-(Ce) is related to some examples of cerium anomaly, where Ce - which is oxidized easily - is separated from other REEs that remain trivalent and thus fit to structures of other minerals than cerianite-(Ce).

Applications
Cerium has two main applications, which are listed below.

The principal industrial application of ceria is for polishing, especially chemical-mechanical planarization (CMP).  For this purpose, it has displaced many other oxides that were previously used, such as iron oxide and zirconia. For hobbyists, it is also known as "opticians' rouge".

In its other main application, CeO2 is used to decolorize glass. It function by converting green-tinted ferrous impurities to nearly colorless ferric oxides.

Other niche and emerging applications

Catalysis
CeO2 has attracted much attention in the area of heterogeneous catalysis.   It catalyses the water gas shift reaction.  It oxidizes carbon monoxide. Its reduced derivative Ce2O3 reduces water, with release of hydrogen.  . 

The interconvertibility of CeOx materials is the basis of the use of ceria for an oxidation catalyst.  One small but illustrative use is its use in the walls of self-cleaning ovens as a hydrocarbon oxidation catalyst during the high-temperature cleaning process.  Another small scale but famous example is its role in oxidation of natural gas in gas mantles.

Building on its distinct surface interactions, ceria finds further use as a sensor in catalytic converters in automotive applications, controlling the air-exhaust ratio to reduce NOx and carbon monoxide emissions.

Energy & fuels 
Due to the significant ionic and electronic conduction of cerium oxide, it is well suited to be used as a mixed conductor. As such, cerium oxide is a material of interest for solid oxide fuel cells (SOFCs) in comparison to zirconium oxide.

Thermochemically, the cerium(IV) oxide–cerium(III) oxide cycle or CeO2/Ce2O3 cycle is a two-step water splitting process that has been used for hydrogen production. Because it leverages the oxygen vacancies between systems, this allows ceria in water to form hydroxyl (OH) groups. The hydroxyl groups can then be released as oxygen oxidizes, thus providing a source of clean energy.

Optics
Cerium oxide has found use in infrared filters, as an oxidizing species in catalytic converters and as a replacement for thorium dioxide in incandescent mantles

Welding
Cerium oxide is used as an addition to tungsten electrodes for Gas Tungsten Arc Welding. It provides advantages over pure Tungsten electrodes such as reducing electrode consumption rate and easier arc starting & stability. Ceria electrodes were first introduced in the US market in 1987, and are useful in AC, DC Electrode Positive, and DC Electrode Negative.

Safety aspects 
Cerium oxide nanoparticles (nanoceria) have been investigated for their antibacterial and antioxidant activity.

Nanoceria is a prospective replacement of zinc oxide and titanium dioxide in sunscreens, as it has lower photocatalytic activity.

See also 
 Cerium
 Cerium anomaly
 Zircon

References

External links

Webelements at University of Sheffield
Synthesis and properties of ceria (in English/Russian)

Oxides
Cerium(IV) compounds
Catalysts
Sunscreening agents
Fluorite crystal structure